Lucky Partners is a 1940 American comedy romance drama film directed by Lewis Milestone for RKO Radio Pictures. The film is based on the 1935 Sacha Guitry film Good Luck, and stars Ronald Colman and Ginger Rogers in their only film together, and Rogers' eleventh and final film written by Allan Scott.

Plot
Portrait painter and caricaturist David Grant, newly arrived in Greenwich Village, wishes Jean Newton good luck on a whim as they pass on the sidewalk. When Jean delivers books, a woman makes her the gift of an expensive dress. She is quarreling with her son-in-law, who had given the dress to his wife. Believing David to be lucky, Jean asks him to partner with her on a ticket for the Irish Sweepstakes.  He agrees only on condition that, if their horse wins, she accompany him on a platonic trip to see the sights before she settles down to married life in Poughkeepsie, New York. She and her fiancé, Frederick "Freddie" Harper, are dubious about the proposition, but he talks them into it.

When their $2.50 ticket is one of the few that draw a horse, its value shoots up. Freddie wants to sell it, but the other two decide to try for the jackpot. Their horse does not even place, but Freddie informs Jean afterward that he sold their half for $6000. Outraged at his duplicity, she offers half the money to David. He only accepts provided she keep their bargain. Once again, he gets her to go against her better judgment.

They drive to Niagara Falls in a new car David has bought in Jean's name. Freddie, suspicious of David's intentions, follows them there. Even though he finds they have separate (though adjoining) hotel rooms and have registered as brother and sister, Freddie is not appeased.

Meanwhile, when David and Jean go dancing, they attract the attention of the Sylvesters, an older couple celebrating their 50th anniversary. They persuade the couple to accompany them to their favorite spot, making David pick Jean up and carry her across a footbridge. On the other side, David kisses Jean.

Later, realizing things have gone far beyond what he had intended, David checks out and drives off in the car. He is stopped by a policeman and, when he admits the car is not his, taken to jail. Jean becomes furious when she realizes he has gone. Then, she and Freddie are also picked up by the police.

They are brought before a judge, and David is forced to admit under oath that he is really Paul Knight Somerset, a celebrated painter who disappeared three years ago after being imprisoned for drawing what was then deemed indecent illustrations for a book (now considered a classic). The court reporters seize upon the story, and the courtroom is packed with the elite of society. Both Jean and David act as their own counsels. By questioning himself on the witness stand, David reveals he is genuinely in love with Jean, and the two are reconciled.

Cast
 Ronald Colman as David Grant 
 Ginger Rogers as Jean Newton 
 Jack Carson as Frederick Harper 
 Spring Byington as Aunt Lucy, Jean's relative and co-worker 
 Cecilia Loftus as Mrs. Alice Sylvester
 Harry Davenport as Judge  
 Leon Belasco as Nick #1, one of the two Nicks who sell Jean and David their ticket
 Walter Kingsford as Wendell, David's lawyer 
 Lucile Gleason as Ethel's Mother, who gives Jean a dress
 Helen Lynd as Ethel 
 Hugh O'Connell as Niagara Hotel Clerk 
 Brandon Tynan as  Mr. Sylvester
 Eddie Conrad as Nick #2

Production
When it became obvious that the then-unknown Jack Carson was intimidated performing opposite Colman and Rogers, director Milestone bolstered his confidence:
"Every time he went into a scene," Milestone related, "I'd say, 'Get in there and pitch. They're no better than you are. Steal that scene.' Finally he got the hang of it. He acquired confidence."

Reception
The film was a big hit, earning a profit of $200,000.

The New York Times noted that screen stories, "like wines, are not always good travelers" in that they can suffer when plot and story is adapted from one language and country to another. They wrote that Lucky Partners "is distinctly not one of those occasions."  In furthering their comparison to wine, they wrote "RKO's craftsmen have preserved its bouquet intact—and the result is a comedy that is dry and sparkling and bubbles till the last drop."  They wrote that the film "retained the impudent charm and rippling wit of the very Gallic Mr. Guitry", and others reasons for its success are because Allan Scott and John Van Druten treated the script "as neatly as even Mr. Guitry could demand" and that director Lewis Milestone "has punctuated the scenes deftly and never allowed the effervescence to escape in a single explosive laugh".  The Evening Independent noted this was the first screen pairing of Ronald Colman with Ginger Rogers.  They wrote "the picture is excellent entertainment despite the rather whimsical plot", and that "Colman does his usual suave job of acting and Ginger Rogers again proves her deft touch for light comedy". The Los Angeles Times wrote "it's a stroke of showmanship, teaming the vivacious Miss Rogers with the debonair Ronald Colman".  The Age wrote that adapting a Sacha Guitry work could be compared to "doctoring" a play by Noël Coward, but that Lewis Milestone's direction of the adaptation is "entertaining and gives Ginger Rogers scope for her unique talent". The Lawrence Journal-World wrote that the film "represents a spectacular merger of Ronald Colman and Ginger Rogers",

Conversely, Craig Butler of Allmovie felt that a film starring such actors as Ronald Colman and Ginger Rogers ought to have been better, calling the film "an innocuous but hardly memorable little time filler". He felt that the film had a "ridiculous premise" that "in the right, deft hands could turn into charming, captivating trifle", but was let down by the director and the writers. He felt that the writers did not seem to agree on what sort of story to tell, and that as a result "the film switches gears rather too often and its parts don't fit together." He also noted that "Colman and Rogers don't have a great deal of chemistry, but they have panache and know-how to spare, and Carson, along with reliable Spring Byington, make the most of what they have."

References

External links
  
  
 

1940 films
1940 comedy films
1940 drama films
1940s romantic comedy-drama films
American black-and-white films
American remakes of French films
American romantic comedy-drama films
RKO Pictures films
Films based on works by Sacha Guitry
Films directed by Lewis Milestone
Films scored by Dimitri Tiomkin
Films with screenplays by Franz Schulz
Films set in Manhattan
Films set in New York (state)
1940s English-language films
1940s American films